Dieudonné de Gozon was the Grand Master of the Knights of Rhodes from 1346 to 1353. He was born to a noble family in Languedoc, France. He carried the nickname Extinctor Draconis which means "The Dragon Slayer" in Latin.

The Dragon of Rhodes
It is so told that there was a dragon in the island of Rhodes, Greece, hiding in the local swamp, and killing the cattle of the local farmers. Despite the orders of the previous Grand Master not to disturb the beast, Gozon slew the dragon, and hung the head on one of the seven gates of the medieval town of Rhodes. The head was on display until around 1837, when it was disposed of by workers responsible for repairing the castle.

In 1347 and 1348 the Grand Master proved his gallantry when the Order marched to the help of King Constantine V of Armenia, threatened by the army of the Sultan of Egypt.

References
Pavlidis, Vangelis. Rhodes, A Story 1306 - 1522. Rhodes: Kasseris Publications. 
Hasluck, Frederick W. "Dieudonné de Gozon and the Dragon of Rhodes." Annual of the British School at Athens 20 (1914), 70-79.

De Gozon, Dieudonne
De Gozon, Dieudonne
1353 deaths
Rhodes under the Knights Hospitaller
14th-century French people